Beltala Girls' High School is a school in Hazra, Kolkata, India. It is a girls' school and is affiliated with the West Bengal Board of Secondary Education for Madhyamik Pariksha (10th Board exams), and to the West Bengal Council of Higher Secondary Education for Higher Secondary Examination (12th Board exams). The school was established in 1920.

References 

High schools and secondary schools in West Bengal
Girls' schools in Kolkata
Educational institutions established in 1920
1920 establishments in India